Edward Joseph Kearns (January 1, 1900 – December 12, 1949) was an American Major League Baseball first baseman.

References

Major League Baseball infielders
Philadelphia Athletics players
Chicago Cubs players
Baseball players from New Jersey
1900 births
1949 deaths